The 1966 Season was the 7th season for the San Diego Chargers as a professional AFL franchise; the team failed to improve on their 9–2–3 record from 1965. In the team's final season at Balboa Stadium, the Chargers went 7–6–1 and finished in third place in the AFL West Division. They would move to San Diego Stadium for the following season. It was the first season to feature an AFL-NFL World Championship Game now known as the Super Bowl. San Diego began the season among the favorites to represent the AFL in the historic game, but faded after a 4–0 start, winning only three more times and finishing in third place in the AFL Western division.

Flanker Lance Alworth was the Chargers' main offensive threat. Catching passes from quarterback John Hadl, he achieved the AFL's triple crown by leading the league in receptions, receiving yards and receiving touchdowns. The Chargers' offense shifted its focus towards the pass, with running back Paul Lowe, the AFL's rushing champion the previous season, seeing far fewer carries in 1966. On defense, the Chargers lost assistant coach Chuck Noll and tackle Ernie Ladd during the offseason, while end Earl Faison left during the regular season. They were strong against the pass, with cornerback Speedy Duncan and safety Kenny Graham making twelve interceptions between them, but became the AFL's worst team against the run.

Offseason

AFL draft

Regular draft 
The 1966 AFL Draft took place on November 27, 1965, late in the previous season. The rival National Football League (NFL) conducted its draft on the same day. Where the same player was drafted by both AFL and NFL franchises, the two would compete to sign him. San Diego struggled to sign their highest selections, with their top six selections (and seven of their first eight) signing for NFL clubs. One of these, running back Russ Smith, was cut by the Atlanta Falcons on 6 July, 1966, and joined the Chargers afterwards, spending a year on the taxi squad before scoring 10 touchdowns over the following four seasons. 7th-round pick Jim Tolbert stayed with the team for six seasons, and returned briefly at the end of his 11-year NFL career; he played in over 100 games in the Chargers' defensive backfield, starting over 50 of them.

San Diego found a long-term starter in the later rounds with offensive tackle Terry Owens. Chosen in the 11th round, he was primarily a backup in his first two seasons, but won a starting role in 1968 and kept it until injuries forced his retirement in 1975, having made over 100 starts in total. In the 13th round, the Chargers selected defensive lineman Houston Ridge. A regular starter during two of his four seasons in San Diego, Ridge would later sue the Chargers, winning $300,000 after successfully arguing that the organization's drug culture had caused the injury that ended his career.

Redshirt draft 
As well as their regular collegiate draft, the AFL also held a separate redshirt draft. This covered players whose graduation had been delayed by taking a redshirt year, meaning that they still had a further year of college football eligibility. Three of these would play for the Chargers, with linebacker Jeff Staggs and running back Brad Hubbert joining the team in 1967, while defensive back Joe Beauchamp skipped his final year of college eligibility and played for the Chargers in 1966. It was the first of ten seasons in San Diego for Beauchamp, who eventually started 97 games, intercepting 23 passes and returning three of them for touchdowns.

Unless noted otherwise, these players began their professional careers in 1967.

Departures and arrivals 
The Chargers lost two 1965 AFL All-Pros in defensive tackle Ernie Ladd and defensive end Earl Faison; the pair had been named 1st-team All-Pros three and four times respectively during their five years in San Diego, but had expressed dissatisfaction with head coach Sid Gillman in his joint role of general manager early the previous season. They had played out the final year of their contracts in 1965, making clear their intention to leave afterwards, and were traded to the Houston Oilers on 15 January in exchange for three defensive players. Four days later, AFL commissioner Joe Foss nullified the trade after finding the Oilers guilty of tampering with the players, whose Chargers contracts would not expire until 1 May. Ladd eventually signed with the Oilers as a free agent on 7 June; Faison re-signed with the Chargers on 29 July, but Gillman waived him when he struggled with injuries, commenting that Faison had, "a long way to go to become average, much less outstanding." The expansion Miami Dolphins signed Faison on October 19.

Other defensive departures included Dick Westmoreland, a cornerback who had finished runner-up for the AFL's rookie of the year award in 1963 and led the team in interceptions in 1964, being voted a 2nd-team All-Pro both times. After struggling with a broken arm in 1965, he was left unprotected by the Chargers in an expansion draft, and claimed by the Dolphins. Another defensive back, Dick Harris, retired from professional football. One of the original Chargers from 1960, Harris had made 29 interceptions over his career while being name twice each to the 1st and 2nd All-Pro teams.

Tight end Dave Kocourek was another original Charger to depart; he was allowed to go to Miami in the expansion draft after making four All-Pro 2nd teams and four AFL All-Star games with San Diego. The Chargers gained a replacement tight end when new AFL commissioner Al Davis awarded them Houston's Willie Frazier as compensation for the loss of Ladd. Frazier had been voted to the All-Star game once as an Oiler and would be twice more as a Charger, in 1967 and 1969. San Diego made a change of specialist kickers, releasing Herb Travenio and giving the job to Dick Van Raaphorst.

San Diego's coaching staff lost a future Hall of Fame head coach when defensive backfield coach Chuck Noll took the same role with the NFL's Baltimore Colts. Noll had been on the Chargers staff since their first season.

Change of ownership 
The Chargers had their first change of majority ownership on August 25 when hotel chain heir Barron Hilton, who had owned the franchise since their formation in 1959, sold controlling shares to a consortium led by National General Corporation chairman Gene Klein. With a price of $10 million, the purchase set a new record for a professional football team. Hilton had announced his plans to sell the team the previous year, as he wanted to spend more time operating the hotel chain that he co-owned with his father Conrad Hilton. This had prompted speculation that the team may move, but Klein stated that they would remain in San Diego.

Klein's consortium included former White House Press Secretary Pierre Salinger and General Motors executive John DeLorean. The Hiltons remained as minority shareholders with a combined 30% ownership. Klein agreed to the record-breaking price as he anticipated that a forthcoming merger of the AFL with the more-established NFL would significantly increase the value of the Chargers.

Personnel

Staff

Roster

Preseason 
San Diego opened their exhibition schedule against the expansion Dolphins and took a quick 24–0 lead through interception-return touchdowns by Kenny Graham and Nat Whitmyer, together with Lance Alworth's 47-yard catch from running back Keith Lincoln. Further touchdowns followed in the second half on a John Hadl pass to Jacque MacKinnon and a short Jim Allison run. Alworth's 89-yard touchdown catch tied the next game at 7–7 but those were the only Chargers points; Oakland won the game with a touchdown in the final minute.

The Chargers next faced Kansas City in Anaheim; it was the second part of the first professional football double-header, directly following a Raiders-Patriots exhibition in the same stadium. Hadl ran for two touchdowns and passed for another, but San Diego lost 31–21. They returned home for their finale, defeating the Patriots with 24 unanswered second-half points. Hadl rushed for another touchdown, and his backup Steve Tensi passed to Don Norton for another. Speedy Duncan (on a 63-yard punt return) and Gene Foster also scored as the Chargers pulled away. The attendance of 11,894 was the smallest for a Chargers game since they moved to San Diego in 1961.

Regular season

Summary 
San Diego, the winners of five division titles in the previous six seasons, were considered among the favorites to represent the AFL at Super Bowl I. They opened by winning a rematch of the previous year's title game with the Buffalo Bills and reached a record of 4–0 while outscoring their opponents by a combined 124–37. After losing their fifth game by a single point, San Diego were unable to recapture their early-season form, going only 3–6–1 from that game onwards and finishing third in their division. Gillman stated that a reason for the Chargers' struggles was the outgoing owner's reluctance to spend money signing their draftees away from NFL teams.

The Chargers' offense had ranked first in both points scored and yards per game the previous year, but slipped to third and fifth in the nine-team AFL in 1966. They did commit the fewest turnovers in the league with 22, nine better than any other team. Hadl again featured as quarterback in every game; his backup Tensi started twice, but was soon benched for Hadl both times. Hadl was second-best among starters for passing yards, touchdowns and interceptions. Alworth was again the outstanding receiver, winning the receiving triple crown by leading the AFL in receptions (73), receiving yards (1,383) and receiving touchdowns (13). He was supported by the rookie Garrison (642 yards, 4 touchdowns), and six year veteran tight end Jacque MacKinnon, who saw increased usage with Kocourek having been traded, scoring six times. Running back Paul Lowe has won the league rushing title the previous year, but was used far more sporadically and ranked only seventh with 643 yards. As a team, the Chargers' average yards per carry of 4.3 was the second-best in the league, but they had the fewest attempts with barely 25 per game.

San Diego's defense was unbalanced, as they ranked second against the pass for yards per game but last against the run for yardage, touchdowns and yards per carry. Opposing offenses exploited this weakness, with 497 rushing plays being called against the Chargers during the season; no other team was run against more than 441 times. Defensive tackle George Gross was unofficially credited with a team-high 4 quarterback sacks; the team as a whole had fewer sacks in the absence of Ladd and Faison, slipping from 38 the previous season to 26 in 1966. Duncan led the team with 7 interceptions, while Graham had 5. Duncan was also the Chargers' main kick returner, ranking second in the AFL with 13.2 yards per punt return and third with 25.7 yards per kickoff return. Van Raaphorst converted 51.6% of his field goal (16 of 31), fourth in the league and slightly worse than Trevenio's 60% from the previous season. Linebacker Rick Redman took over the punting duties after sharing the role with Hadl the previous year, but his 37-yard average per attempt was the league's worse among players with at least 40 punts.

Schedule

Game summaries

Week 1: vs. Buffalo Bills 

In a rematch of the 1964 and 1965 AFL title games, Buffalo drove into Charger territory on their first two drives, but were foiled by a deflected field goal attempt and a Graham interception. After the second of these, San Diego converted three 3rd downs, including a 3rd and 5, 7-yard touchdown catch by Alworth. A succession of punts followed before Buffalo missed another field goal shortly before halftime, leaving the Chargers 7–0 ahead.

San Diego opened the 3rd quarter with a nine-minute drive that featured a 4th and inches conversion by Gene Foster and culminated in Van Raaphorst's first field goal. Miller Farr intercepted Jack Kemp three plays later, leading to another Van Raaphorst kick to open the final quarter. Buffalo drove into Charger territory before Kemp was intercepted again, with Bud Whitehead returning the ball 61 yards to the Bills' 31 yard line. That led to Hadl's second touchdown pass, again on 3rd down, and Duncan wove through would-be tackler on an 81-yard punt return touchdown shortly afterwards. The Chargers were close to a shutout, but Buffalo converted a late 4th and 8 before scoring their only points on the following play.

The Charger defense allowed Kemp, a former Charger, only 4 completions on 20 attempts for 74 yards and with 3 interceptions, a 2.9 passer rating compared to 140.7 from Hadl.

Week 2: vs. Boston Patriots 

A 37-yard catch by Alworth set up Van Raaphorst's short field goal late in the opening quarter. He had a chance to double the lead in the 2nd quarter, but missed wide right from 40 yards out. After an exchange of punts, Graham intercepted an underthrown Babe Parilli pass and returned it 32 yards for a touchdown with 2:20 left in the half. That left enough time for the Chargers to score again, as their defense forced a three-and-out before three Hadl completions covered 56 yards, with Alworth catching the last of these to make it 17–0 at halftime.

Boston, who had failed to cross the halfway until the final play of the half, began making chances after the break. Gino Cappelletti missed a 45-yard field goal attempt, then four consecutive drive penetrated the Chargers 30; Chuck Allen, Farr and Whitehead stopped the first three with interceptions, while the fourth ended with an incompletion on 4th and 1. Five plays later, Jim Allison went around right end and broke several tackles en route to the 61-yard touchdown that finished the scoring.

The Charger defense allowed 252 yards while forcing four turnovers. They achieved the franchise's first shutout since Week 12, 1963.

Week 4: at Oakland Raiders 

Duncan set up the Chargers' first points with an interception of Cotton Davidson and 31-yard return into Oakland territory. The Raiders tied the score on the following drive, then put San Diego back ahead with a special teams error; on 4th and 8 from their own 11, their center snapped the ball over the punter's head and out of the end zone for a safety. After the ensuing free kick, Hadl converted a 3rd and 10 with a 16-yard pass to Garrison, and scored himself from a yard out. Duncan intercepted another Davidson pass after Oakland had reached the San Diego 42, and the Chargers led 12–3 at the interval.

On the first drive of the second half, Whitehead was flagged for a 35-yard defensive pass interference penalty that moved the ball to the 2-yard line and led to a Raiders touchdown on the following play. Hadl connected with Lincoln for 45 yards on the next play from scrimmage, then restored San Diego's nine-point lead with a 19-yard touchdown pass to MacKinnon on 3rd and 16. Duncan intercepted Davidson for the third time, setting up a Van Raaphorst field goal and causing Oakland to switch quarterbacks; Tom Flores entered the game and was soon intercepted by Rick Redman, though Hadl was intercepted in return. Flores threw a touchdown early in the final quarter, and Oakland added a field goal after declining to go for it on 4th and 1. With their lead cut to 22–20, San Diego responded with a 3-play, 68-yard touchdown drive; Alworth had a 43-yard catch despite double coverage, Lowe went around right end for 17 yards and Foster went around left end for 8 yards and the touchdown. Flores was sacked on 4th down to ensure the Chargers' win.

Duncan tied a franchise record, becoming the fifth Charger to achieve three interceptions in a game. The two Raiders quarterbacks combined to complete 11 of 31 passes for 191 yards, with a touchdown and four interceptions.

Week 5: vs. Miami Dolphins 

San Diego faced the expansion Dolphins for the first time. Miami took a 10–0 lead in the 2nd quarter, scoring after a Lowe fumble and a Hadl interception, while the Chargers drove no further than midfield throughout the first half. Instead, their defense scored; Miami had a 2nd and 3 at the Chargers 35 when Steve DeLong forced a fumble that Redman caught in mid-air before racing clear to cut the deficit to 10–6 at halftime.

Steve Tensi replaced Hadl for the second half; he attempted only two passes in his first drive, which stalled at the goalline and resulted in a chip shot field goal. He followed this up with his first touchdown pass as a professional, 25 yards to Foster for the lead. Early in the final period, Allison recovered a muffed punt at the Dolphins 44 and Tensi found Alworth behind the defense on the next play for another touchdown. After Buncom blocked a Dolphins field goal attempt, Tensi again struck on the next play, this time finding Foster for his second touchdown. When Lincoln threw to Alworth on a trick play, it was the Chargers' third touchdown in four offensive plays, and Tensi combined with Willie Frazier two minutes left to complete the scoring.

Tensi's 12 pass attempts were the first of his career, and his passer rating of 156.2 would remain his best. Hadl completed 6 of 11 for 62 yards and an interception. San Diego had two 100-yard receivers: Foster (6 for 134, 2 touchdowns) and Alworth (6 for 119, 2 touchdowns).

Week 6: at New York Jets 

Tensi was given the start after his impressive performance the previous week, and set up the first Van Raaphorst field goal with a 32-yard pass to MacKinnon. He failed to complete any of his five passes on the next drive, finishing with an interception that set up the Jets at the San Diego 42; they scored five plays later, and Hadl came in for the rest of the game. Graham intercepted Joe Namath early in the 2nd quarter, leading to a field goal. After New York made a field goal of their own with 1:10 left in the half, Hadl completed 4 of 6 passes for 45 yards, positioning Van Raaphorst for the 42-yard kick that made it 10–9 at the break.

Van Raaphorst attempted a field goal from around midfield on the first drive of the 3rd quarter, but it was partially blocked. Three plays later, Farr's interception and 35-yard return set the Chargers up at the New York 26. San Diego reached 3rd and goal at the 8, were pushed back 36 yards by a pair of offensive holding penalties and regained 12 yards through a Hadl run, then Van Raaphorst was wide right from 40 yards out. In the final quarter, Duncan intercepted Namath at the New York 47. San Diego picked up a first down at the 36, then were driven back by a 19-yard holding call on Gary Kirner and a 12-yard sack of Hadl. Facing 2nd and 41, Hadl threw a screen pass to Lincoln, who benefitted from blocks by Walt Sweeney, Ron Mix, Allison and Garrison en route to a 67-ayrd touchdown. Namath came back with a 44-yard completion on the next play, and Emerson Boozer soon restored the Jets' lead. A 30-yard catch-and-run by Garrison gave Van Raaphorst another chance, but he had another kick partially blocked, this time from 30 yards out with 2:32 to play. New York gained one first down before punting, leaving Hadl at his own 19 with 1:27 to play and a single timeout to work with. He opened with three consecutive completions to Alworth, covering 31, 15 and 7 yards. A 14-yard pass to Garrison set Van Raaphorst up for one more attempt, which he missed wide right from 21 yards with 25 seconds to play.

Van Raaphorst made his first three field goals, but missed his next four. The seven total attempts remain a Charger record . Tensi completed 2 of 10 passes for 45 yards and an interception, with a passer rating of 6.2. San Diego lost despite clear advantages in takeaways (3–10), yards of offense (445–248) and first downs gained (23–12).

Week 7: at Buffalo Bills 

Buffalo reached a 3rd and 4 at the Chargers 29 on the opening possession, but Graham intercepted Kemp at the San Diego 5. The Chargers converted four 3rd down on their ensuing 95-yard touchdown drive, three by Lincoln, including a 32-yard catch on 3rd and 19. That moved the ball to the Buffalo 12, and Frazier's touchdown catch followed three plays later. The Bills had field goal attempts on their next two drives, but Booth Lusteg missed them both. A 35-yard Alworth catch then positioned Van Raaphorst for a success from 31 yards out. After Buffalo went three-and-out, Lincoln had catches of 42 and 21 yards for a touchdown 35 seconds before halftime; the Bills quickly responded with Lusteg's 41-yard kick, but still trailed 17–3.

Howard Kindig intercepted Kemp the San Diego 13 in the 3rd quarter. Redman had to punt from inside his own end zone after Hadl was sacked at the 1, and his punt was returned all the way to the Chargers 4; Daryle Lamonica replaced Kemp and threw a touchdown on 4th and goal from the 3. Van Raaphorst had a chance to add to the lead early in the final quarter, but was short from 42 yards. Following an exchange of punts, Buffalo were aided by a 28-yard pass interference call on Duncan en route to the Lamonica's game-tying quarterback sneak. The Chargers went three-and-out and Buffalo moved into position for a game-winning field goal, but Lustig was off target from 23 yards with seconds remaining.

San Diego were outgained by 320 yards to 219, but had the only takeaways of the game with the interceptions of Kemp.

Week 8: at Boston Patriots 

Beauchamp fumbled the opening kickoff, but George Gross recovered a fumble at the Chargers 11 two plays later. San Diego advanced to a 3rd and 4 from the Boston 42, from where Alworth took a screen pass all the way in for a touchdown. Gross gave the Chargers a chance to extend their lead when he recovered a second fumble at the Eagles 37, but Van Raaphorst eventually missed a 25-yard kick. The Patriots then drove 80 yards the other way, with Babe Parilli converting a 3rd and 18 the play before his first touchdown pass. On the following Boston drive, Parilli converted a 3rd and 9 and again followed up immediately by throwing for a touchdown. Alworth's 36-yard catch on the next play from scrimmage set up a success from 43 yards for Van Raaphorst, and a Dick Degen interception in Chargers territory kept the deficit at 14–10 entering halftime.

Midway through the 3rd quarter, Alworth got behind the defense for a 66-yard go-ahead touchdown, before San Diego's defense forced a punt. Three plays later, Hadl had a pass intercepted by Ron Hall and returned 34 yards to the Chargers' 3. Boston went ahead to stay after two further plays, and Parilli extended the lead with a 53-yard touchdown on their next play from scrimmage. The Chargers reached midfield midway through the final quarter, but Hadl was intercepted again, setting up the clinching Patriots touchdown.

As well as his two fumble recoveries, Gross was credited with nine solo tackles and five assists. With his 177 receiving yards, plus a 3-yard run, Alworth accounted for over half of San Diego's 329 offensive yards.

Week 9: vs. Denver Broncos 

Foster fumbled in his own territory four plays into the game and Denver drove for a touchdown, converting a 4th and inches en route. Foster came back with a 37-yard run and a 19-yard catch on the next drive, which ended with Lincoln's touchdown run. The Broncos retook the lead in the 2nd quarter when Bob Scarpitto ran 63 yards on a fake punt. Van Raaphorst missed a 31-yard kick on the following drive, but the Charger defense forced a punt that Duncan returned 37 yards to the Denver 39. San Diego reached a 4th and 2 at the Broncos 9, which Hadl converted with an 8-yard pass to McKinnon. Garrison's touchdown catch followed on 3rd and goal. Denver regained the lead with a field goal 55 seconds before halftime. Lowe's 54-yard kickoff return set up the Chargers at the Denver 40 and led to a quick response. Hadl found Alworth for 11 yards and McKinnon for 28; after two runs for no gain, another completion to McKinnon covered the final yard with 10 seconds on the clock, putting San Diego up 21–17.

Lincoln fumbled at the end of a 23-yard run early in the 3rd quarter, with Denver recovering at their own 19. The Broncos soon faced a 4th and 7, but Scarpitto again ran for a first down on a fake punt. The Broncos reached 4th and goal at the 4, where they again went for it, with Bob Petrich stopping a run for the loss of 2 yards. Van Raaphorst converted a 26-yard field goal with nine minutes to play, and Denver had only one more possession after that. They reached 4th and 14 at the San Diego 23 and tried a fake field goal with a pass that the Chargers stopped for a loss of 2 yards. A pair of 3rd down conversion catches by Garrison enabled the Chargers to run out the clock.

Lincoln's 95 rushing yards represented the only time he ran for more than 24 yards all season, and his touchdown was his last as a Charger.

Week 10: at Kansas City Chiefs 

First place in the AFL West division was at stake in this game, with the Chiefs entering with a 6–2 record, half a game ahead of the Chargers. Kansas City punted from their own 11 on their first possession, but a roughing the punter penalty prolonged the drive, which resulted in a touchdown after a further eleven plays. San Diego tied the score in response. Alworth converted a 3rd and 7 with a 3-yard catch, then went deep over the middle on a 3rd and 11 from the Kansas City 46, catching Hadl's pass near the 5 and scoring. Duncan intercepted Len Dawson in Chargers territory on the following drive, but Kansas City forced a punt and drove 80 yards for a touchdown. The Chiefs added a field goal on their next drive, then a Hadl interception led to Dawson's second touchdown a play later. The half ended with Alworth making a 27-yard catch, but being tackled at the Kansas City 7, leaving the CHiefs 24–7 ahead.

Kindig and Redman combined to stop the Chiefs short on a 4th and inches early in the 3rd quarter, turning the ball over at the Kansas City 43. Hadl converted two 3rd downs with completions to MacKinnon and Alworth, the latter for a touchdown. San Diego threatened to pull closer on their next drive as Garrison's 22-yard catch on a 3rd and 23 brought them to the Chiefs 37, but Hadl's 4th-down pass fell incomplete. Midway through the final quarter, the Chiefs reached a 3rd and goal at San Diego 6 before John Milks intercepted Dawson. A 46-yard catch by MacKinnon took the Chargers across midfield, but they were pushed back by a penalty and a sack. They punted on 4th and 29, and Kansas City saw the remainder of the game out without difficulty.

Week 11: vs. Oakland Raiders 

On the game's second play Tom Flores completed a 68-yard pass, following up with his first touchdown three plays later. The Chargers also had a big play on their first drive, as Lowe broke clear for 57 yards around left end, eventually being tackled at the 2. Garrison's touchdown catch came two plays later. San Diego added a field goal on their next possession, but Oakland then took control with three consecutive touchdown drives, the second following a missed field goal and the third set up by an interception of Hadl.

Trailing 28–10, Tensi replaced Hadl in the second half and opened up with a field goal drive, but Van Raaphorst had another attempt blocked late in the 3rd quarter. Clem Daniels had a 64-yard run two plays later, leading to a Raiders touchdown. San Diego didn't score again until Tensi and MacKinnon combined in the final seconds.

Oakland gained 477 yards in total, the most San Diego's defense had given up since 1962.

Week 13: at Denver Broncos 

Duncan muffed a punt early in the game, with the Broncos recovering at the San Diego 4. From there the Charger defense was able to hold Denver to 2 yards and a short field goal. Later, a second Denver field goal attempt was blocked by Duncan. Hadl was intercepted soon afterwards, and the Broncos reached San Diego's 35 yard line before being stopped by Beauchamp's interception. Denver went for it on 4th and inches at the San Diego 19 on their next drive, but running back Mike Kellogg fumbled and they lost 10 yards. Alworth's 47-yard catch gave the Chargers their best scoring chance of the first half, but Van Raaphorst was wide right from 21 yards. The half ended with Beauchamp intercepting a long pass at his own 2, and Denver 3–0 ahead.

Don Estes recovered a fumble on the opening kickoff of the second half, setting the Chargers up at the Denver 24 and leading to a field goal; the Broncos restored their three-point lead with a Gary Kroner field goal on the next drive. Kroner had a 44-yard attempt later in the 3rd quarter, which was blocked by Gross and returned 16 yards to his own 43 by Whitehead. Lowe threw a 25-yard pass to MacKinnon on the next play, and the Chargers ended the quarter facing a 3rd and 15 on the Denver 27. Hadl hit a leaping Alworth at the Denver 2, and he progressed into the end zone for the Chargers' lone lead of the day. The Broncos reached a 4th and 3 at the San Diego 36 from where Gross batted away a 4th-down pass and the Chargers took over on downs. They drove to the Denver 14, from where Van Raaphorst's 22-yard kick was blocked and run back for a touchdown by John Bramlett. San Diego reached Denver's 44 on the next possession, but Hadl's 4th-down pass was broken up, and Wendell Hayes broke away for a touchdown on the next play. Alworth caught 4 passes for 33 yards and a touchdown in the Chargers' quick response, but Denver recovered an onside kick to secure the win.

This defeat enabled the Chiefs to clinch the AFL West, ending the Chargers' three-year run as division champions. Tensi was the starting quarterback for the Chargers, but was pulled for Hadl after completing 1 pass for 7 yards from 2 official attempts (he had two further incompletions wiped out by penalties). Lowe had 25 passing yards, 66 rushing yards and 25 receiving yards.

Week 14: at Houston Oilers 

With the game scoreless, a Hadl pass was intercepted at his own 38, but Gross won back possession with a fumble recovery four plays later. After a holding penalty, the Chargers faced a 3rd and 13 at their own 22; Alworth made a fingertip catch at the Houston 40 and continued into the end zone for the game's first touchdown. Houston missed field goals on their next two drives, then tied the game after Hoyle Granger's 54-yard run set them off on a 92-yard touchdown drive. Starting their response with less than two minutes left in the half, San Diego needed only three Hadl passes to cover 80 yards, the last 51 to Alworth, who again got behind the last defender. Duncan made an interception on the next play from scrimmage, but Hadl was intercepted on the play after that, allowing Houston to score through a George Blanda field goal and trail only 14–10 at halftime.

Hadl was sacked at his own 2 yard line early in the 3rd quarter, causing Redman to punt from his own end zone; the punt struck the uprights and went out of bounds in the end zone for a safety. Houston added a touchdown four plays after the ensuing free kick, taking their first lead of the game. The rest of the quarter was scoreless, though Duncan blocked a Blanda field goal, and Van Raaphorst was wide right from 33 yards. San Diego covered 60 yards on four plays on their first possession of the final period; Hadl completed passes of 23, 12 and 24 yards, the last of these a touchdown to Garrison. The Oilers reached 1st and goal from the 2 in response, but eventually settled for a field goal after Ridge's 3rd-down tackle at his own 1. Following an exchange of punts, the Chargers took over at their own 36 with two minutes to play, trailing by one point. Foster gained 15 yards on a draw play, before Hadl had back-to-back completions of 18 and 17 yards to Garrison and Foster. On 3rd and 8 from the 12, Hadl found MacKinnon in the end zone for the game-winner with 31 seconds left. Houston were able to reach the San Diego 42 before the game ended with a sack of Don Trull.

Hadl had 158 of his 341 yards in the final quarter. The Chargers were able to win despite committing more turnovers (3 to 2) and being outgained (395 yards to 378).

Week 15: vs. New York Jets 

New York was already 3–0 ahead when Hadl was intercepted in his own territory, leading to a 17-yard touchdown drive; Duncan blocked the extra point. Hadl responded by converting two 3rd downs with completions, one to Alworth on 3rd and 5 and one to Garrison on 3rd and goal from the 8. Archie Matsos intercepted Namath two plays later, setting up his offense at the New York 34. Hadl was sacked for the loss of 11, Lowe gained 8 yards back, then the Chargers ran a flea flicker on 3rd and 13, with Hadl finding Garrison for 20 yards. The drive ended with Allison's touchdown, to which the Jets responded with a 14-play field goal drive, leaving San Diego 14–12 ahead at the break.

Lowe opened the second half by breaking through the middle for a 57-yard gain to the Jets 1-yard line, before scoring on the following play. Namath pulled his team back within two points with a 53-yard touchdown pass, then the Jets muffed a punt that Degen recovered at their 41. Hadl ran for gains of 20 and 11 yards, the latter carry for a touchdown. Namath's 60-yard pass had the Jets threatening again, but Redman made an end zone interception on 3rd and 7 from the 8. Hadl converted a 3rd and 24 with a 36-yard pass to MacKinnon, then threw a 3-yard touchdown to the same player. On the next three plays, Duncan intercepted Namath and returned the ball 14 yards to his own 45, Alworth caught a 46-yard pass and Lowe scored from the 9. That gave the Chargers three touchdowns in three possessions, to which the Jets could only respond with a single late touchdown.

Lowe's 126 rushing yards represented both his highest total of the season and the 15th and final 100-yard game of his career.

Week 16: vs. Kansas City Chiefs 

Alworth drew a 37-yard pass interference penalty on the game's first play, leading to a successful Van Raaphorst field goal. A 48-yard completion from Dawson was the biggest play as the Chiefs responded with a touchdown. Hadl fumbled while being sacked on the next drive, with the Chargers recovering for a loss of 30 yards at their own 3-yard line. After a punt, Kansas City started at the San Diego 44 and drove for another touchdown. Redman ran 32 yards with a fake punt early in the 2nd quarter, but that drive ended with a missed 26-yard kick from Van Raaphorst. Alworth later scored on a 38-yard touchdown catch, before Kansas City added a field goal and led 17–10 at halftime.

DeLong recovered a fumble at the Chiefs 38 on the first play of the second half, leading to Lowe's game-tying touchdown. After another Kansas City field goal, Alworth's 38-yard catch on 3rd and 15 moved the ball to the Chiefs 44, but Hadl was intercepted two plays later. In the final quarter, Tolbert intercepted a long Dawson pass at the 2 before throwing a lateral to Whitehead, who returned the ball to the Chargers 22. Lowe's 22-yard run and Garrison's 5-ayrd catch converted a pair of 3rd and 1 situations as San Diego drove to a first down at the Chiefs 22. After a 9-yard sack on Lowe was an incompletion, Hadl's 25-yard pass to Garrison was wiped out by a 23-yard holding penalty. Following a further incompletion, the Chargers punted, and Kansas City drove 80 yards for the clinching touchdown.

This was the final Chargers game at Balboa Stadium, as the team would move into the newly-constructed San Diego Stadium the following season.

Standings

Awards 
Six Chargers were in the West team for the AFL All-Star game, while three were named to the Associated Press All-AFL 1st team and one to the 2nd team. Also, Alworth received two of the twenty-seven available votes for the UPI AFL player of the year award.

Notes

References

External links
Pro-Football-Reference.com: 1966 San Diego Chargers

San Diego Chargers
San Diego Chargers seasons
San Diego Chargers f